Case Lyman "Casey" Patten (May 7, 1874 – May 31, 1935) was a professional baseball player.  He was a left-handed pitcher over parts of eight seasons (1901–1908) with the Washington Senators and Boston Red Sox.  For his career, he compiled a 105–128 record in 270 appearances, with a 3.36 earned run average and 757 strikeouts.

In the history of the Washington/Minnesota franchise, Patten ranks tenth in wins (105), sixth in innings pitched (2059.3), tenth in games started (237), second in complete games (206), sixth in hits allowed (2146), and seventh in losses (127).

He was born in Westport, New York and later died in Rochester, New York at the age of 61.

See also
 List of Major League Baseball annual saves leaders

External links

1874 births
1935 deaths
Major League Baseball pitchers
Baseball players from New York (state)
Washington Senators (1901–1960) players
Boston Red Sox players
Wilkes-Barre Coal Barons players
Kansas City Blues (baseball) players
People from Westport, New York